The 2009 election to the Grand Council was held in the canton of Geneva, Switzerland, on 11 October 2009.  All 100 members of the Grand Council were elected for four-year terms.

The Liberal Party remained the largest party, with twenty seats, having lost three since 2005.  The centre-right 'Entente', between the Liberals, Free Democratic Party, and Christian Democrats lost a total of five seats.  The main winners were the populist Geneva Citizens' Movement, who almost doubled their number of seats to draw level with the Green Party as the second-largest contingent.  The far left alliance between solidaritéS and the Swiss Party of Labour failed to overcome the 7% threshold for representation, despite each having each separately received more than 6% at the 2005 election.

Results

|-
! style="background-color:#E9E9E9;text-align:left;" colspan=2 |Party
! style="background-color:#E9E9E9;text-align:left;" width=150px |Ideology
! style="background-color:#E9E9E9;text-align:right;" width=50px |Vote %
! style="background-color:#E9E9E9;text-align:right;" width=50px |Vote % ±
! style="background-color:#E9E9E9;text-align:right;" width=50px |Seats
! style="background-color:#E9E9E9;text-align:right;" width=50px |Seats ±
|-
| width=5px style="background-color: " |
| style="text-align:left;" | Liberal Party
| style="text-align:left;" | Classical liberalism
| style="text-align:right;" | 16.71
| style="text-align:right;" | –1.71
| style="text-align:right;" | 20
| style="text-align:right;" | –3
|-
| style="background-color: " |
| style="text-align:left;" | Green Party
| style="text-align:left;" | Green politics
| style="text-align:right;" | 15.34
| style="text-align:right;" | +1.51
| style="text-align:right;" | 17
| style="text-align:right;" | +1
|-
| style="background-color: " |
| style="text-align:left;" | Geneva Citizens' Movement
| style="text-align:left;" | Populism
| style="text-align:right;" | 14.74
| style="text-align:right;" | +7.01
| style="text-align:right;" | 17
| style="text-align:right;" | +8
|-
| style="background-color: " |
| style="text-align:left;" | Social Democratic Party
| style="text-align:left;" | Social democracy
| style="text-align:right;" | 12.91
| style="text-align:right;" | –1.71
| style="text-align:right;" | 15
| style="text-align:right;" | –2
|-
| style="background-color: " |
| style="text-align:left;" | Christian Democratic People's Party
| style="text-align:left;" | Christian democracy
| style="text-align:right;" | 9.91
| style="text-align:right;" | +0.07
| style="text-align:right;" | 11
| style="text-align:right;" | –1
|-
| style="background-color: " |
| style="text-align:left;" | Free Democratic Party
| style="text-align:left;" | Classical liberalism
| style="text-align:right;" | 9.59
| style="text-align:right;" | –0.90
| style="text-align:right;" | 11
| style="text-align:right;" | –1
|-
| style="background-color: " |
| style="text-align:left;" | Swiss People's Party
| style="text-align:left;" | National conservatism
| style="text-align:right;" | 8.56
| style="text-align:right;" | –1.04
| style="text-align:right;" | 9
| style="text-align:right;" | –2
|-
| style="background-color: " |
| style="text-align:left;" | solidaritéS–Swiss Party of Labour
| style="text-align:left;" | Socialism
| style="text-align:right;" | 6.40
| style="text-align:right;" | –7.171
| style="text-align:right;" | 0
| style="text-align:right;" | ±0
|-
| 
| style="text-align:left;" | Defence of the Elderly
| style="text-align:left;" | Pensioners' party
| style="text-align:right;" | 5.85
| style="text-align:right;" | N/A
| style="text-align:right;" | 0
| style="text-align:right;" | N/A
|- style="background: #E9E9E9"
! style="text-align:left;" colspan=3| Total (turnout 39.66%)
| style="text-align:right;" |  100.00
| style="text-align:right;" | –
| 100
| style="text-align:right;" | –
|-
| colspan=9 style="text-align:left;" | 1 Compared to total of separate solidaritéS (6.67%) and 'Alliance of the Left' (6.90%) lists in 2005
|-
| colspan=9 style="text-align:left;" | Source: Republic and Canton of Geneva
|}

Footnotes

2009 elections in Switzerland
2009